Jules Haabo (born 12 April 1997), is a French Guianan professional footballer who plays for the French Guiana national football team.

Career statistics

International

International goals
Scores and results list French Guiana's goal tally first.

References

External links
 
 Jules Haabo at Caribbean Football Database

1997 births
Living people
Association football midfielders
French Guianan footballers
French Guiana international footballers
People from Kourou